The Musée-Galerie de la Seita was a museum of tobacco-related objects located in the 7th arrondissement of Paris at 12, rue Surcouf, Paris, France. It opened in 1979 and closed in June 2000.

The museum opened in 1979 on the site where Gros Caillou tobaccos were once manufactured. It displays collections acquired from 1937 onwards by the Societe Nationale d'Exploitation Industrielle des Tabacs et Allumettes (SEITA), the former state-owned manufacturer of French tobacco products including Gitanes and Gauloises.

The museum displays about 400 tobacco-related objects from Europe and elsewhere, selected from a total collection of about 3000 pieces. Its exhibits explain the plant and its botanical features, early factories, ritual and social uses, and methods of consuming tobacco. The museum contains a fine collection of wooden, ceramic, and meerschaum pipes, including hookahs and Native American ceremonial pipes, as well as items from the Musée de l'Homme reflecting the origins of tobacco in pre-Columbian America.

Its gallery has displayed temporary art exhibitions by artists including Jean-Michel Basquiat, Otto Dix, Alexej von Jawlensky, Alfred Kubin, and Marianne von Werefkin.

Footnotes

See also 
 Musée du Fumeur
 List of museums in Paris

References 
 Catalogue du Musée de la Seita, Musée-Galerie de la Seita Editions, 1992.
 Paris.org entry
 Museums of Paris entry
 New York Times article, September 18, 1994
 Pipe Dreams

Defunct museums in Paris
Museums disestablished in 2000
History of tobacco